Running Y Ranch is a census-designated place (CDP) in Klamath County, Oregon, United States. Occupying the lands of Running Y Ranch Resort, a planned community, it was first listed as a CDP prior to the 2020 census.

The CDP is in southwestern Klamath County, on a cluster of hills between Upper Klamath Lake to the northeast, Wocus Marsh to the southwest, and Caledonia Marsh to the northwest. Payne Canyon, in the center of the hills, is the site of the Running Y Ranch Golf Course.

Demographics

References

External links

Census-designated places in Klamath County, Oregon
Census-designated places in Oregon